Chukcha is an impact crater in Taimyr Peninsula, Russia.

It is 6 km in diameter and the age is estimated to be less than 70 million years old (Cretaceous or younger). The crater is exposed to the surface.

References 

Impact craters of Russia
Cretaceous impact craters
Impact craters of the Arctic
Landforms of Krasnoyarsk Krai